Guraini is a town near Dhanapur in Chandauli District in Uttar Pradesh state of India.

Guraini is about 13;km from Zamania. A government school is located in Guarani.

References

Cities and towns in Jaunpur district